Marquis Huan of Cai (蔡桓侯) (?–695 BC), born Jī Fēngrén (姫封人), was the twelve ruler of the State of Cai from 715 BC to 695 BC.  He was the only known son of Marquis Xuan of Cai (蔡宣侯), his predecessor.  His reign was a period of 20 years.  He was succeeded by his son.

References 
 Shiji
 Chinese Wikipedia
 
 

Zhou dynasty nobility
Cai (state)
8th-century BC Chinese monarchs
7th-century BC Chinese monarchs